Charaxes (Polyura) sacco is a butterfly in the family Nymphalidae. It was described by Paul Smart in 1977. It is endemic to the New Hebrides.

Biology
The larva feeds on Poinciana.

References

External links
Polyura Billberg, 1820 at Markku Savela's Lepidoptera and Some Other Life Forms

Polyura
Butterflies described in 1977